Earthlight is a horizontally scrolling shooter published for the ZX Spectrum in 1988 by Firebird Software. Written by Pete Cooke, Earthlight features parallax scrolling and shadow effects, a novelty for the Spectrum.

Plot
The player takes the role of an alien explorer from the star-system of Arcturus, called Slaatn, who has been drawn off-course by a beam of energy from Earth and has had to make a landing on the Moon. Slaatn must neutralise the box-like transmitters and thus eliminate the force field.

Reception
CRASH awarded the game 90%, with the reviewers impressed with every aspect of the game, particularly the 3D shaded graphics and the sound effects. The gameplay was compared to that of Uridium. Your Sinclair awarded 8/10, describing it as a polished game but without the depth of Pete Cooke's previous releases.

References

External links

1988 video games
Europe-exclusive video games
Horizontally scrolling shooters
Telecomsoft games
Video games developed in the United Kingdom
Video games set on the Moon
ZX Spectrum games
ZX Spectrum-only games
Single-player video games